Thomas Bersinger (born 4 December 1985 in Pau) is a French-born Argentine slalom canoeist who has competed at the international level since 2013.

He won a bronze medal in the Extreme K1 event at the 2018 ICF Canoe Slalom World Championships in Rio de Janeiro.

World Cup individual podiums

1 World Championship counting for World Cup points

References

External links

1985 births
Living people
Argentine male canoeists
Medalists at the ICF Canoe Slalom World Championships